Dmitri Igorevich Malgin (born July 28, 1987) is a Kazakhstani professional ice hockey goaltender currently playing for HC Almaty in the Kazakhstan Hockey Championship (KAZ). He has formerly played with top tiered club, Barys Astana of the Kontinental Hockey League (KHL).

External links

Living people
1987 births
HC Almaty players
Sportspeople from Oskemen
Kazakhstani ice hockey goaltenders
Kazzinc-Torpedo players
Yertis Pavlodar players
Nomad Astana players
Barys Nur-Sultan players
Kazakhstani people of Russian descent
Universiade medalists in ice hockey
Universiade silver medalists for Kazakhstan
Competitors at the 2013 Winter Universiade